Diego Eduardo Cayupil Lipán (born 5 March 1998) is a Chilean footballer who plays for Deportes Iberia.

Career
Cayupil was with Colo-Colo youth system for 5 years until he moved to Deportes Temuco. In 2022, he joined Deportes Iberia in the Segunda División Profesional.

At international level, in 2018 he was called up to the first microcycle by the coach Reinaldo Rueda of the Chile senior team.

Personal life
Cayupil Lipán is of Mapuche descent.

References

External links
 

1998 births
Living people
People from Nueva Imperial
Chilean people of Mapuche descent
Mapuche sportspeople
Indigenous sportspeople of the Americas
Chilean footballers
Deportes Temuco footballers
Deportes Recoleta footballers
Deportes Iberia footballers
Chilean Primera División players
Primera B de Chile players
Segunda División Profesional de Chile players
Association football midfielders